"Good Good Father" is a song performed by Christian contemporary Christian-modern worship musician Chris Tomlin. It was released as the lead single from his 2016 album, Never Lose Sight, on October 2, 2015. The song is a cover of Housefires's "Good Good Father". The song became Tomlin's sixth Hot Christian Songs No. 1. The track held the No. 1 position for seven weeks.

Background
"Good Good Father" was released on October 2, 2015, as the lead single for Tomlin's eleventh studio album, Never Lose Sight. The song is a cover of Housefires's "Good Good Father", which gained popularity shortly after Tomlin's version was released. The song is about how good God has been to him throughout his life. It topped the Billboard Christian Airplay, scoring his eighth Airplay number-one. The feat ties him with Jeremy Camp for the most No. 1s as a soloist. The song also won the GMA Song of the Year award in 2016. Despite its success, the song has been criticized for being "not identifiably Christian, completely narcissistic, and poor poetry."

Music video
The music video for the single "Good Good Father" was released on February 18, 2016. One of the song's writers, Pat Barrett, makes a guest appearance in the visual.

Track listing
Digital download
"Good Good Father" – 4:57
Digital download (featuring Pat Barrett)
"Good Good Father" – 4:20

Charts

Weekly charts

Year-end charts

Decade-end charts

Certifications

References 

2015 singles
2015 songs
Chris Tomlin songs
Song recordings produced by Ross Copperman